Maciço do Urucum ("Urucum Massif"), also known as Morro do Urucum ("Urucum Hill") is a mountain in southern Brazil, south of the city of Corumbá, Mato Grosso do Sul. It is the highest mountain in the state, reaching . The rock formation is mined for manganese by Rio Tinto Group and Vale do Rio Doce.

References 

Mountains of Brazil
Highest points of Brazilian states
Landforms of Mato Grosso do Sul